Platysiagum is an extinct genus of prehistoric bony fish belonging to the family Platysiagidae. Fossils are known from the Middle Triassic of China and Italy and the Early Jurassic of England.

See also

 Prehistoric fish
 List of prehistoric bony fish

References

Prehistoric neopterygii
Prehistoric bony fish genera